Nebulosa nervosa is a moth of the family Notodontidae. It is found in Mexico and Guatemala.

References

Moths described in 1884
Notodontidae